Numata is a city in Gunma Prefecture, Japan.

Numata may also refer to:

Places
Numata, Hokkaido, a town in Sorachi Subprefecture, Hokkaido, Japan
Numata Domain, a former domain of Japan
Numata Castle, a castle in Numata, Gunma
Numata Station, a railway station in Numata, Gunma

Other uses
Numata (surname), a Japanese surname
Numata (moth), a moth genus